Antipope Gregory XVII may refer to: 

 Clemente Domínguez y Gómez (1946–2005), self-proclaimed pope, leader of the Palmarian Catholic Church
 Jean-Gaston Tremblay (1928–2011), self-proclaimed pope, leader of the Apostles of Infinite Love

See also
Siri thesis, the claim that Giuseppe Cardinal Siri was elected pope in 1958, with the name Gregory XVII
Earthly Powers, a novel by Anthony Burgess that includes a character named Pope Gregory XVII